Wirrabara is a town and a locality in South Australia, about  north of Adelaide. It is located in the Southern Flinders Ranges in the Mid North of South Australia, along the Rocky River. The Horrocks Highway (Main North Road) passes through the town. At the 2016 census, the locality had a population of 403 of which 230 lived in its town centre.

History
The name Wirrabara derives from a corruption of two words from the Kaurna language of the "Adelaide tribe", wirra (gum trees) and birra (running water); in the Nukunu language of the local Nukunu people, wira and parl means gum trees with honey and water.

A timber milling industry was established in Wirrabara during the early 1850s. The town was surveyed in 1874. In 1877 the first government forest nursery in Australia was planted in the nearby Wirrabara forest.

The Wilmington railway line was extended north from Gladstone and Laura through Wirrabara and Booleroo Centre to Wilmington in the 1910s after the locals had been pleading with the government to build it for many years.

The historic Copper Mine Chimney, Wirrabara on Main North Road, a remnant of the former Charlton mine, is listed on the South Australian Heritage Register.

Description
According to Peter Goers, the town's name is pronounced "Rabra" by locals.

The town still has a timber industry and a farming community. There is a producers' market on the third Sunday of the month, and nearby is an example of silo art by the artist Smug (aka Sam Bates).

See also
Wirrabara Range Conservation Park

References

Further reading

Towns in South Australia